Mastered by Guy at The Exchange is the second studio album by Ben Jacobs under his stage name of Max Tundra. Released on 2 September 2002 through Domino Records in the United Kingdom and by Tigerbeat6 Records in North America, making it his first album to be distributed in North America. The album was also Max Tundra's first to be released with vocals on nearly all the tracks.

Two singles were released from the album: "Lysine" and "Cabasa". The album failed to chart in both the United Kingdom and the United States, but received high critical acclaim with the music website Pitchfork referring to the album as a "A massive achievement" and placed it on their list of Top 50 albums of 2002.

Production
Mastered by Guy at The Exchange was the first Max Tundra album to use vocals. In an interview with Pitchfork he explained that "The songs are extremely different from those on the first record. When I was writing Some Best Friend You Turned Out to Be, I thought of all sorts of weird and wonderful machines and instruments I could use to make noises, but singing never occurred to me. I had never considered using my voice on any Max Tundra record ever, but hey, I like to keep things varied, so this time round I figured what the hell!" Jacobs had previously used vocals was in a "Will Oldham pastiche" cover version of Taylor Dayne's "Tell it to My Heart", released as a B-side to the "Ink Me" single, in which he sang with an American accent. For the album he chose to sing in an English accent. 

Max Tundra found it difficult to write lyrics as well, saying "I'm getting to grips with writing lyrics, but it is somewhat more difficult than anything I've done before... The lyrics themselves are taking ages to write-- it's something I'm not used to." The other vocalist on the album is Becky Jacobs who is Max Tundra's sister. The album's title is literal; it was mastered by Guy Davie at a studio named The Exchange.

Music

Lyrics

This is Tundra's first album with vocals, and all but one of the tracks have vocals. The lyrics on Mastered by Guy at The Exchange have been described as stream of conscious and not being rich with subtext. Max Tundra refers to this on "Labial" with "I only sing about things that happen to me/ I never learned to fill my songs with allegory" The BBC noted recurring themes included "unaffected tales of Food Chemistry, bands splitting up, employment history and even an homage to video maker Michel Gondry." while Pitchfork noted theme of "girls he's loved or loves, complaints about his day jobs". The lyrics are also littered with musical references. References range from trance music and the band Yes where he sings "Downstair's they're playing trance again / that awful bendy guitar / up through the floor again / It's 9am till I cry / And Time and a Word my friend / Inspires me more than guitars". The lyrics to "MBGATE" are derived from a quote taken from The Third Policeman by Flann O'Brien. Pitchfork also described the song "Gondry" as a plea to filmmaker and music video director Michel Gondry to direct one for him with lyrics referencing his music videos for "Let Forever Be" and "Around the World". Gondry himself included the song at the end of his Work of Director retrospective on DVD. Stylus Magazine described the album's first single for "Lysine" as sounding like a nutrition manual with lyrics of "many foods are rich in arginine, concentrate on the ones with more lysine". Max Tundra has also stated that not everything he wrote about actually happened. In an interview with Stylus Magazine, he proclaimed that "half the lyrics on that album are true and half are false, but I'm not gonna tell you which half."

Style
Max Tundra's vocals have been described as "high, mellifluous" and that they resemble Scritti Politti's Green Gartside and Prince. The album's music style has been described by AllMusic as a "jumpy collision of found sounds, Squarepusher-type beat thrashes, and jaunty wrestling with "real" instrumentation." In a review from the BBC noted of "songs which shift gears regularly, ending up in places their openings barely hint at". The BBC pointed out "Cabasa" which "starts life as lopsided techno and ends up as a slice of piano driven barrelhouse boogie" and "Hilted" which "mutates from Commodore 64 game soundtrack to sunkissed acoustic guitar pop". The BBC's view was reflected in Stylus Magazines review the album which stated that "You may have heard the pounding house anthem that "Labial" sounds vaguely like, but the prog flourishes will catch you off guard".

Release and reception

Mastered by Guy at The Exchange was released in 2002 by Tigerbeat6 in North America and Domino in the United Kingdom. The album failed to chart in the United States and was not reviewed by many critics but was received positively by those who did. Kingsley Marshall of the online music database AllMusic gave the album four out of five star rating, comparing the album's style to Prince and Squarepusher. The BBC's Peter Marsh wrote positively that Max Tundra has "come up with an album which has more ideas per minute than most of his contemporaries can manage over the course of a career." Chris Dahlen of Pitchfork gave the album a very positive review, referring to the album as "A massive achievement" and claiming that there was "so many synths, beeps, beats, glitches, horns, hooks, voices. It shouldn't work. But it does. Perfectly." Pitchfork also listed the album as the 12th best album on their list of top 50 albums of 2002, and 52nd on their list of the top 100 albums released between 2000 and 2004. Pitchfork also placed the album at number 182 on their list of top 200 albums of the 2000s.

In 2022, electronic musician and PC Music founder A.G. Cook praised the album: "Mastered by Guy at the Exchange is a true cult album—a playful monolith that sounds both nothing and everything like the 2000s. Stumbling across it as a teenager, it reinforced a hunch I had: that music is a place where anything could happen, and total chaos could be held together by the lightest of pop hooks. There’s an oddly British quality to Max Tundra’s work, a soft and polite maximalism - pioneering, eccentric and infinitely remixable."

Track listing

Personnel
 Max Tundra – vocals, various instruments, programming
 Becky Jacobs – vocals
 Ben Payne – voice
 Guy Davie – mastering
 Alom Shaha – voice
 Lucy Kendra – voice

Release history

References

External links

Mastered by Guy at The Exchange at Domino Records
Video for "Lysine" on YouTube

2002 albums
Max Tundra albums
Domino Recording Company albums
Tigerbeat6 albums